Hwasong concentration camp (Chosŏn'gŭl: , also spelled Hwasŏng or Hwaseong) is a labor camp in North Korea for political prisoners. The official name is Kwan-li-so (Penal-labor colony) No. 16.

Location 

The camp is located in Hwasong County (Myonggan County), North Hamgyong Province in North Korea. It is situated along the upper reaches of the Hwasong River in a secluded mountain valley. The western border is Mantapsan, a  mountain. On the north and east sides, the camp reaches the Orangchon River valley. The camp is not included in maps, but the entrance gate and the ring fence with watchtowers can be recognized on satellite images.

Description 
Hwasong camp is a penal-labor colony in which detainees are imprisoned for life with no chance to be released. The number of prisoners is estimated at 20,000. They are classified as "anti-revolutionary and anti-party elements" and held on charges such as opposing the succession of Kim Jong-il. Many of the prisoners are merely family members of suspected wrongdoers, who are held captive in a “guilt-by-association” punishment. It is believed that the camp was founded in the 1990s.

Working conditions 
Prisoners are exploited for hard, dangerous, and deadly labor in mining, logging, and agriculture. According to Mr. Lee, a former security officer in Hwasong camp, the inmates were overworked and had very little time to rest. Prisoners had to work all day until they fulfilled their quotas and attend self-criticism meetings afterward. Often they were allowed to sleep only four hours in the night. Mr. Lee witnessed many fatal accidents in the workplace.

The North Korean nuclear tests made in 2006, 2009, 2013 and 2016 at Punggye-ri Nuclear Test Site is just  to the west of the camp border. Several defectors reported that political prisoners were forced to dig tunnels and build underground facilities in areas exposed to nuclear radiation.

Human rights situation 
Information is extremely limited, as the camp has always been a maximum security camp under strict control and surveillance. An unidentified teenager reported how he was sent to the camp with his entire family at age 13. He witnessed his father being beaten cruelly and his mother and sisters being raped by security officers. Residents from nearby villages heard about the horrific conditions inside the camp but were never allowed to get near the camp.

Security officer Lee explained the methods to execute prisoners in an interview with Amnesty International. He witnessed prisoners forced to dig their own graves and being killed with hammer blows to their necks. He also witnessed prison officers strangling detainees and then beating them to death with wooden sticks. According to him, several women were raped by the officials and executed secretly thereafter.

Camp expansion 
Analysis of satellite images by Amnesty International in October 2013 shows that the prisoner population of Hwasong camp has slightly increased compared to 2008. In several prisoner villages, new housing structures and new administrative buildings can be identified. Some of the new prisoners may have been relocated from Hoeryong concentration camp to Hwasong.

Former prisoners/guards (witnesses) 
 Besides the unidentified teenager, no former prisoner was found to provide a direct testimony, probably for fear of retribution.
 Mr. Lee (full name withheld for his safety; 1980s - mid-1990s in Hwasong) was a security officer in the camp.

See also 

 Human rights in North Korea
 Prisons in North Korea
 Yodok concentration camp
 Kaechon internment camp

References

External links 
 – Overview of North Korean prison camps with testimonies and satellite photographs.
 – Comprehensive analysis of various aspects of life in political prison camps.
 – Analysis of satellite images of Hwasong camp and Yodok camp.
 – Video with testimonies about Hwasong camp and Yodok camp.
 One Free Korea – Camp 16 and Mt. Mantap Nuclear Test Site (satellite images with explanations).
 The Daily NK: The Hub of North Korean News – News about North Korea and human rights.

Concentration camps in North Korea